The Centrist Democratic Party (PDC) is a political party in Rwanda.

History
The party was established as the Christian Democratic Party (Parti Démocratique Chrêtien) in 1991 by Jean-Népomuscène Nayinzira. It joined the government in December 1991 and was given a single ministerial post.

In the run-up to the August 2003 presidential elections the party was banned as a result of a constitutional prohibition on religious-based parties. The party was reconstituted as the Centrist Democratic Party in time to contest the September parliamentary 2003 elections, in which it allied itself with the ruling Rwandan Patriotic Front, winning three seats. PDC leader Alfred Mukezamfura was elected Speaker of the Chamber of Deputies.

The party continued its alliance with the RPF for the 2008 parliamentary elections, but was reduced to one seat. In 2009 Agnès Mukabaranga was elected leader of the party after Mukezamfura stepped down. It was again part of the RPF-led alliance for the 2013 parliamentary elections, in which it retained its single seat.

References

External links
Official website

Political parties in Rwanda
Christian democratic parties in Africa
Christianity in Rwanda
Political parties established in 1991
1991 establishments in Rwanda
Religious organisations based in Rwanda